The Ecce Homo (Latin: "Behold the Man") in the Sanctuary of Mercy church in Borja, Spain, is a fresco painted circa 1930 by the Spanish painter Elías García Martínez depicting Jesus crowned with thorns. Both the subject and style are typical of traditional Catholic art.

While press accounts agree that the original painting was artistically unremarkable, its current fame derives from a good faith attempt to restore the fresco by Cecilia Giménez, an untrained amateur artist, in 2012. The intervention transformed the painting and made it look similar to a monkey, and for this reason it is sometimes referred to as Ecce Mono (roughly Behold the Monkey; mono translates to monkey in Spanish).

Original mural
The artist, a professor at the School of Art of Zaragoza, gave the painting to the village where he used to spend his holidays, painting it directly on the wall of the church in about 1930. He commented that "this is the result of two hours of devotion to the Virgin of Mercy". His descendants still live in Zaragoza and were aware that the painting had deteriorated seriously; his granddaughter had made a donation toward its restoration shortly before they discovered that the work had been radically altered in an incomplete attempt to restore it.

Failed restoration attempt and internet phenomenon

The authorities in Borja said they had suspected vandalism at first, but then determined that the alterations had been made by an elderly parishioner, Cecilia Giménez, who was 81 years old at the time. She said on Spanish national television that she started to restore the fresco because she was upset that parts of it had flaked off due to moisture on the church's walls. "Giménez defended herself, saying she could not understand the uproar because she had worked in broad daylight and had tried to salvage the fresco with the approval of the local clergyman. 'The priest knew it,' she told Spanish television. 'I've never tried to do anything hidden.'"

Giménez said that the attempted restoration was actually an uncompleted work in progress. "I left it to dry and went on holiday for two weeks, thinking I would finish the restoration when I returned," she said. "When I came back, everybody in the world had heard about Ecce Homo. The way people reacted still hurts me, because I wasn’t finished with the restoration. I still think about how if I hadn’t gone on holiday, none of this would have ever happened."

News of the painting spread around the globe in August 2012 (the silly season) on mainstream and social media, which promptly rose to the status of an internet phenomenon. BBC Europe correspondent Christian Fraser said that the result resembled a "crayon sketch of a very hairy monkey in an ill-fitting tunic". The restored version has been jokingly dubbed Ecce Mono ('Behold the Monkey';  is Latin for 'behold', whereas  is Spanish for 'monkey'; in Latin, it is ) in an "online rush of global hilarity", and the incident was compared to the plot of the 1997 film Bean. Because of the negative attention, the priest of the church, Father Florencio Garces, thought the painting should be covered up.

Giménez said in 2015 that "everyone here sees what I did in a different light. The restoration has put Borja on the world map, meaning I’ve done something for my village that nobody else was able to do. So many people have come here – and to our beautiful church – to see the painting ... they tell me more than 130,000 people."

Artistic significance
Tongue-in-cheek critiques have interpreted the piece as a multifaceted comment on both sacred and secular themes. A Forbes commentator suggested that the "inept restoration" represented "one woman's vision of her savior, uncompromised by schooling". In September 2012, the artistic group Wallpeople presented hundreds of reworked versions of the new image on a wall near the Centre de Cultura Contemporània de Barcelona. An organizer commented that "Cecilia has created a pop icon".

Later on, Spanish actress Assumpta Serna co-produced with Wildcard UK a documentary called Fresco Fiasco and acted in the movie Behold the Monkey, two films about the restoration. Both projects were seen in February 2016 on the Sky Arts network in the UK.

Tourist success
The interest from tourists was such that the church began charging to see the fresco. In the year following the failed restoration, tourist activity generated 40,000 visits and more than €50,000 for a local charity. Giménez has sought a share of the royalties; her lawyer said that she wanted her share of the profits to help muscular dystrophy charities because her son suffers from the condition.
The mayor had to mend the dispute between the families of both authors.
By 2016, the number of tourists visiting the town had increased from 6,000 to 57,000 or even 200,000; in addition to spending money with local businesses, visitors have donated some €50,000 to the church. The money has been used to employ additional attendants at the church and to fund a home for retirees. On 16 March 2016, an interpretation centre dedicated to the artwork was opened in Borja.
The €3 tickets generate over €40,000 that, among other expenses, pay €15,000 for two (some years even five) elderly people in the town home for retirees.
Cecilia Giménez also keeps 50% of the merchandising profit.

See also

 Behold the Man, La Ópera de Cecilia
 Accidental damage of art
 Outsider art

References

External links

 Despite Good Intentions, a Fresco in Spain Is Ruined
 Something to sing about: 'worst art restoration ever' inspires an opera

 Episode 36: Behold the Monkey – Illustrated episode of the podcast The Lonely Palette discussing the incident
 Cecilia and the Saints – modern folksong by Tracie Potochnik, inspired by the incident

Ecce Homo
Paintings depicting Jesus
Fresco paintings in Spain
Spanish paintings
Internet memes
Province of Zaragoza
2012 in Spain
2012 in art
1930s paintings